The Brockville Blues were a minor league baseball team based in Brockville, Ontario, Canada. The team competed in the Canadian–American League for two seasons. In 1936, they were known as the Brockville Pirates and were not affiliated with any major league team. In 1937, they played as the Blues and were a farm team of the Boston Red Sox.

Brockville had previously fielded a minor league team in 1888, in the Eastern International League.

Jesse Spring, the team's player-manager in 1936, was best known as a professional ice hockey player, having spent six seasons in the National Hockey League (NHL).

Results by season

References

Baseball teams established in 1936
Baseball teams disestablished in 1937
1936 establishments in Ontario
1937 disestablishments in Ontario
Defunct minor league baseball teams
Defunct baseball teams in Canada
Boston Red Sox minor league affiliates